Sir Edward Brandis Denham  (1876 – 2 Jun 1938) was a British colonial administrator. He served as Governor of the Gambia (1928–1930), British Guiana (1930–1935) and Jamaica (1935–1938).

Life
Edward Brandis Denham was educated at Malvern College and Merton College, Oxford. Joining the colonial service as a cadet in the Ceylon Civil Service, he later served as colonial secretary of Mauritius (1920–1923) and acting governor of Kenya (1923–1928). He became Governor of the Gambia in November 1928, finding it hard to deal with the general strike called by the Bathurst Trade Union in late 1929. In January 1930 he left the Gambia to become Governor of British Guiana.

He was appointed Governor of Jamaica by the colonial office in 1935. His short three-year stint was troubled with political and social unrest. There had been serious riots at the docks in Kingston and Falmouth in May and October 1935. 1938 opened with a cane cutters' strike on Serge Island Estate in the parish of St. Thomas. In response, Governor Denham fired off anxious telegrams to the colonial office in London. To head off trouble, Governor Denham appointed commissions to investigate wage rates and unemployment, followed by emergency public works initiatives.

The Governor found the islands' problems complex and difficult to solve. Denham thought the real problems of Jamaica were less economic than political. The recent emergence of a group of well-educated mixed-raced Jamaican politicians posed the main threat to British colonial rule. Imperialism and democracy proved difficult to merge, but a system of democratic ruling of the Jamaican people allowed Sir Edward Denham to continue his rule of the islands.

Denham died of a heart attack at Kings House, the Governors' residence, on 2 June 1938. On Friday 3 June 1938 the crew of HMS Ajax (22) buried the Jamaican Governor's body at sea at sunset outside the three-mile limit offshore after his bronze coffin was taken to the ship on a gun carriage. King George VI sent a cable to Jamaica "I have learned with the deepest regret of the death in Jamaica of Sir Edward Denham. Captain General and Governor-in-chief. In him, the Empire has lost a public servant of long experience and distinguished ability. His death is a grave loss to the colony and will, I know, bring sorrow to the hearts of all my people in Jamaica".

In 1944, six years after his death, Jamaicans were granted universal adult suffrage, an idea initiated by Governor Edward Denham.  An area in the western section of Kingston called 'Denham Town' is named after him and in his memory the Sir Edward Denham Memorial Prize is awarded at Royal College Colombo since 1939.

References 

1876 births
1938 deaths
Governors of the Gambia
Governors of British Guiana
Governors of Jamaica
People educated at Malvern College
Alumni of Merton College, Oxford
Knights Grand Cross of the Order of St Michael and St George
Knights Commander of the Order of the British Empire
Colonial Secretaries of Mauritius